Pattonsville may refer to:

 Pattonsville, Ohio
 Pattonsville, Virginia